Gabriel Silva may refer to:
 Gabriel Silva Luján, (born 1957) Colombian diplomat and political scientist.
 Gabriel Silva (footballer, born 1989) (born 1989), Brazilian football leftback
 Gabriel Silva (footballer, born 1991), Brazilian football leftback
 Gabriel Silva (footballer, born 2002), Brazilian football forward
 Gabriel A. Silva, neuroscientist 
Gabriel Silva (Panamanian congressman)